Nikol is a given name and a surname.

Given name 
 Nikol Pashinyan, an Armenian revolutionary and politician

Surname 
 Jenna Nikol, alias of the American model Kayden Kross
 Ronny Nikol, German football player

See also 
 Nicol
 Nikola
 Nikolaos
 Nikos
 Nichol
 Nicols
 Nicoll
 Nichol
 Nicholl
 Nicolle
 Nicola (disambiguation)
 Nicole (disambiguation)
 Nickel (disambiguation)
 Nickle (disambiguation)
 Nikel